The 1919 Isle of Thanet by-election was a parliamentary by-election for the British House of Commons constituency of Isle of Thanet on 15 November 1919.

Vacancy
The by-election was caused by the death of the sitting Unionist MP, Norman Carlyle Craig on 14 October 1919. He had been MP here since winning the seat in January 1910. The constituency had been held by the Unionists since its creation in 1885.

Electoral history
At the 1918 general election, Craig was returned unopposed, having been in receipt of the Coalition 'coupon'.
The result at the last contested election was

Candidates

The local Unionists adopted as candidate, 22-year-old Hon. Esmond Harmsworth. He was part of the Northcliffe-Rothermere Press family which owned newspapers such as the Daily Mail. Although adopted by the Unionists, he considered contesting the election as an 'Anti-Waste' candidate, opposed to what the Rothermere Press had labelled as excessive Coalition Government spending. However, he was persuaded to stand as an official Unionist but allowed to fight the election on a programme of measures in opposition to the Coalition Government and as a result did not receive the coalition 'coupon'.
The Liberals chose William J. West as their candidate. He had contested Winchester at the last election, coming second. West had been politically active in Battersea working for John Burns. In 1904 he served as Mayor of Battersea and was a founder of the Railway Clerks Trade Union.

Main issues and campaign
At the 1918 general election, Coalition Liberal Prime Minister, David Lloyd George had famously stated that the task for the new government would be to build "Homes fit for Heroes". His plan was for the government to raise funds through taxation to allow local councils to build houses and Coalition Liberal Reconstruction Minister, Christopher Addison successfully steered through Parliament the Housing Act 1919. However, there were parts of the Unionist Party that opposed these plans including Harmsworth.
Harmsworth's Anti-Waste platform of cuts in government spending and reductions in Income Tax was enthusiastically supported by The Times, the Daily Mail and the Daily Mirror. He also had the active support of Horatio Bottomley, a prominent right-wing MP who had founded the People's League in opposition to the government. 
At an eve of poll meeting in support of Harmsworth, Bottomley proclaimed that he expected in about 2 years to be asked by the King to form a 'business administration'.

Result
As expected, the Unionists held the seat but the Liberals polled strongly. Compared to the last contested election, there had been a 9% swing to the Liberals. 

When Harmsworth took his seat he became the Baby of the House.

Aftermath
Despite Harmsworth's disappointing result, the issue of taxes/public spending continued to dominate the 1919-22 parliament and an Anti-Waste League was formed to rally right-wing opinion and contest future by-elections. The Coalition Government's Council House Building Policies continued. Bottomley was not asked to form a government by the King but was to serve at His Majesty's Pleasure for 7 years at Wormwood Scrubs.
The result at the following General election;

Harmsworth continued to sit for the constituency until 1929.

References
 Who's Who: www.ukwhoswho.com
 Debrett's House of Commons 1922
 Trial By Ballot by Ivor RM Davies

See also
 List of United Kingdom by-elections
 United Kingdom by-election records
 

Isle of Thanet by-election
By-elections to the Parliament of the United Kingdom in Kent constituencies
Isle of Thanet by-election
1910s in Kent
Isle of Thanet by-election